Darío Esteban Melo Pulgar (born 24 March 1993) is a Chilean footballer who plays for Segunda División Profesional de Chile side Deportes Melipilla as a goalkeeper.

Career
In 2021, he joined Deportes Concepción.

In January 2023, he joined Deportes Melipilla.

Honours
Palestino
Copa Chile: 2018

Colo-Colo
Copa Chile: 2019

International
Chile
China Cup: 2017

References

External links
 
 Darío Melo at Football-Lineups
 

1994 births
Living people
Footballers from Santiago
Chilean footballers
Chile under-20 international footballers
Chile international footballers
Club Deportivo Palestino footballers
Deportes Temuco footballers
Colo-Colo footballers
Deportes Concepción (Chile) footballers
Unión San Felipe footballers
Deportes Melipilla footballers
Chilean Primera División players
Primera B de Chile players
Segunda División Profesional de Chile players
Association football goalkeepers